Westering High School is a public co-ed high school in Westering, Port Elizabeth, South Africa catering for English-speaking students from grade 8 to 12.

History

Under the leadership of Mr Peter Blackbeard, Westering High School was established in 1970 with 185 pupils. It has grown into a high school of 980 pupils and 45 teaching staff.

Building extensions during the late seventies changed the physical appearance of the school.

Coat of arms
This was designed by Mrs R Blackbeard, wife of the first principal of the school. The principal charge is the chevron which is also found on the P. The lamp of learning is placed at the honor point of the shield. The flame is the symbol of Christianity. The school colors are navy blue, gold white

Subjects offered

Grade 8-9
All Subjects are compulsory for Grade 8-9.
English Primary Language
Afrikaans or Xhosa  ( Additional Language)
Mathematics
Social Sciences(SS)  - which includes History & Geography
Natural Sciences( NS) which includes Science and Biology
Economic and Management Science( EMS)  -  Accounting  & Business Economics
Life Orientation (LO)
Arts and Culture  (A&C)
Technology ( a wide variety of  information and  methods of how things work)

Grade 10-12
A pupil must do 7 subjects 4 compulsory subjects from Group A (including two languages) and three from Group B

Group A (All compulsory)
English (Home Language)
Afrikaans or Xhosa (Additional language)
Life Orientation
Maths or Maths Literacy

Group B:  (Must do 3 of these )
History, Geography, Life sciences (Biology), Physical Science, Accounting, Business Studies, Consumer Studies (Home Economics), Tourism, Music, Visual Arts (Art), Computer Applications Technology (CAT-Computyping ), Information technology (IT-Computer studies)

References
Westering High School Website

Educational institutions established in 1970
Schools in the Eastern Cape
Buildings and structures in Port Elizabeth
1970 establishments in South Africa